Nicolás Adrian Schiavi (born 1 February 1995) is an Argentine professional footballer who plays as a midfielder for Italian  club Carrarese.

Career
Born in Argentina, Schiavi started his professional career in Italy. He was a player for Novara youth team in 2013 Trofeo Dossena. He was promoted from Novara's under-19 team in 2014, for 2014–15 Lega Pro season. However, after the club promoted back to Serie B, Schiavi played only 2 times in 2015–16 Serie B season. He was assigned number 20 shirt. On 16 July 2016 Schiavi left for Modena. He was assigned number 32 shirt of Modena.

In 2017–18 season, he was assigned number 16 shirt of Novara.

On 11 August 2021, he signed with Juve Stabia.

On 10 August 2022, Schiavi moved to Carrarese on a two-year contract.

Career statistics

References

External links
 Novara profile 
 

1995 births
Living people
People from Rafaela
Sportspeople from Santa Fe Province
Argentine footballers
Association football midfielders
Atlético de Rafaela footballers
Serie B players
Serie C players
Novara F.C. players
Modena F.C. players
A.C. Cuneo 1905 players
S.S. Juve Stabia players
Carrarese Calcio players
Argentine expatriate footballers
Argentine expatriate sportspeople in Italy
Expatriate footballers in Italy